Opie Cates (10 October 1909, in Arkansas – 6 November 1987, in Oklahoma) was an American clarinet player and band leader in the 1930s and 1940s, during the swing era, who became a radio actor.

Life and career
Cates was born Opal Taft Cates, the son of a farmer in Arkansas, and was also raised in Kansas and Missouri.

By 1931 he was on the radio with his own band. He served for a time in the 1940s as musical director on radio's Judy Canova Show, where his Arkansas drawl amused audiences when he introduced songs. He then became the star of his own radio sitcom, The Opie Cates Show, on ABC in 1947–1948, where he played a naive rube getting adjusted to big city life. Barbara Fuller played his love interest, with Francis X. Bushman as her father, Opie's boss. Cates would begin each show by saying, "The doggonedest thing happened to me th' other day," and proceed to introduce the episode's plot. The show found no sponsor and lasted only thirteen weeks. He reappeared in more or less the same role in the rural milieu of radio's Lum and Abner in 1949, telling stories about his hometown of Clinton, Arkansas, and was included in the pilot episode of an unsold television version of Lum and Abner that year.

Cates was also musical director of the NBC radio show Meet Me at Parky's (1945), starring Parkyakarkus, and of Granby's Green Acres, a 1950 CBS radio show with much of the Lum and Abner cast that later inspired the television series Green Acres.

Andy Griffith named his character's son "Opie Taylor" on The Andy Griffith Show after Opie Cates, whom Griffith and producer Sheldon Leonard both liked.

References

1909 births
1987 deaths
Swing clarinetists
Big band bandleaders
American radio personalities
American male comedians
Four Star Records artists
Musicians from Arkansas
Musicians from California
Musicians from Oklahoma
American clarinetists
20th-century American musicians
20th-century American comedians